The Women's Prize for Fiction (previously with sponsor names Orange Prize for Fiction (1996–2006 and 2009–12), Orange Broadband Prize for Fiction (2007–08) and Baileys Women's Prize for Fiction (2014–2017)) is one of the United Kingdom's most prestigious literary prizes. It is awarded annually to a female author of any nationality for the best original full-length novel written in English and published in the United Kingdom in the preceding year. A sister prize, the Women's Prize for Non-Fiction, was launched in 2023.

History
The prize was established in 1996, to recognise the literary achievement of female writers. The inspiration for the prize was the Booker Prize of 1991, when none of the six shortlisted books was by a woman, despite some 60% of novels published that year being by female authors.  A group of women and men working in the industry – authors, publishers, agents, booksellers, librarians, journalists – therefore met to discuss the issue. Research showed that women’s literary achievements were often not acknowledged by the major literary prizes.

The winner of the prize receives £30,000, along with a bronze sculpture called the Bessie created by artist Grizel Niven, the sister of actor and writer David Niven.  Typically, a longlist of nominees is announced around March each year, followed by a shortlist in June; within days the winner is announced.  The winner is selected by a board of "five leading women" each year.

The prize has "spawned" several sub-category competitions and awards: the Harper's Bazaar Broadband Short Story Competition, the Orange Award for New Writers, the Penguin/Orange Readers' Group Prize, and the Reading Book Group of the Year.

In support of the 2004 award, the Orange Prize for Fiction published a list of 50 contemporary "essential reads". The books were chosen by a sample of 500 people attending the Guardian Hay Festival and represent the audience's "must have" books by living UK writers. The list is called the Orange Prize for Fiction's "50 Essential Reads by Contemporary Authors".

The prize was originally sponsored by Orange, a telecommunications company. In May 2012, it was announced Orange would be ending its corporate sponsorship of the prize. There was no corporate sponsor for 2013; sponsorship was by "private benefactors", led by Cherie Blair and writers Joanna Trollope and Elizabeth Buchan.

Beginning in 2014, the prize was sponsored by the liquor brand Baileys Irish Cream, owned by the drinks conglomerate Diageo. In January 2017, Diageo announced that it had "regretfully decided to make way for a new sponsor", and would step aside after the 2017 prize was announced that June.

In June 2017, the prize announced that it would change its name to simply "Women's Prize for Fiction" starting in 2018, and would be supported by a family of sponsors.

In 2023 it was announced that a sister prize, the Women's Prize for Non-Fiction, would be awarded for the first time in 2024, with a £30,000 prize which for the first three years would be funded by the Charlotte Aitken Trust, who would also supply the winner's statuette, "The Charlotte".

Winners and shortlisted writers

The winner of the 2022 Women's Prize for Fiction was Ruth Ozeki for her fourth novel, The Book of Form and Emptiness.

#ThisBook
In May 2014, Baileys Women's Prize for Fiction launched the #ThisBook campaign to find out which books, written by women, have had the biggest impact on readers. Nineteen "inspirational women" were chosen to launch the campaign and then thousands of people from the "general public" submitted their ideas via Twitter. The 20 winners were announced on 29 July 2014. The organisers noted that nearly half (eight) of the winning books were published before 1960.

To Kill a Mockingbird (1960), Harper Lee
The Handmaid's Tale (1985), Margaret Atwood
Jane Eyre (1847), Charlotte Brontë
Harry Potter (1997), J. K. Rowling
Wuthering Heights (1847), Emily Brontë
Pride and Prejudice (1813), Jane Austen
Rebecca (1938), Daphne Du Maurier
Little Women (1868–69), Louisa May Alcott
The Secret History (1992), Donna Tartt
I Capture The Castle (1948), Dodie Smith
The Bell Jar (1963), Sylvia Plath
Beloved (1987), Toni Morrison
Gone With The Wind (1936), Margaret Mitchell
We Need to Talk About Kevin (2003), Lionel Shriver
The Time Traveller's Wife (2003), Audrey Niffenegger
Middlemarch (1871–72), George Eliot
I Know Why The Caged Bird Sings (1969), Maya Angelou
The Golden Notebook (1962), Doris Lessing
The Color Purple (1982), Alice Walker
The Women's Room (1977), Marilyn French

Reclaim Her Name

To mark the 25th anniversary of the prize, sponsor Baileys worked with the prize organisers to republish 25 books written by female authors that were originally published under male pseudonyms, such as Middlemarch by Mary Ann Evans (George Eliot). The books show the author's real name on the book jacket, in a series titled Reclaim Her Name.

Criticism
The fact that the prize excludes male writers has provoked comment. After the prize was founded, Auberon Waugh nicknamed it the "Lemon Prize", while Germaine Greer said there would soon be a prize for "writers with red hair". A. S. Byatt, who won the 1990 Man Booker Prize, said it was a "sexist prize", claiming that "such a prize was never needed". She refused to have her work considered for this prize. In 2007, former editor of The Times Simon Jenkins called the prize "sexist". In 2008, writer Tim Lott said that "the Orange Prize is sexist and discriminatory, and it should be shunned".

On the other hand, in 2011 London journalist Jean Hannah Edelstein wrote about her own "wrong reasons" for supporting the prize: 
Unfortunately, the evidence shows that the experiences of male and female writers after they set their pens down are often distinctively different. That's why I've changed my mind about the Orange prize. I still agree with Byatt that the idea of female-specific subject matter is spurious, but I don't think that's what the prize rewards.In 2012 Cynthia Ozick, writing in The New York Times, said the Prize "was not born into an innocent republic of letters" when it comes to a history of women writers being discriminated against. She concluded: "For readers and writers, in sum, the more prizes the better, however they are structured, and philosophy be damned."

In 1999 Lola Young, chair of the judges' panel, claimed that British female literature fell into two categories, either "insular and parochial" or "domestic in a piddling kind of way". Linda Grant suffered accusations of plagiarism following her award in 2000. In 2001 a panel of male critics strongly criticised the Orange shortlist and produced its own.  In 2007, broadcaster Muriel Gray, chair of the panel, said that judges had to wade through "a lot of dross" to get to the shortlist, but praised that year's winner, Half of a Yellow Sun by Nigerian author Chimamanda Ngozi Adichie, saying: "This is a moving and important book by an incredibly exciting author."

In 2019, Akwaeke Emezi's debut novel, Freshwater, was nominated—the first time a non-binary transgender author has been nominated for the prize. Women's prize judge Professor Kate Williams said that the panel did not know Emezi was non-binary when the book was chosen, but she said Emezi was happy to be nominated. Non-binary commentator Vic Parsons wrote that the nomination raised uncomfortable questions, asking: "would a non-binary author who was assigned male at birth have been longlisted? I highly doubt it." After the nomination, it was announced that the Women's Prize Trust was working on new guidelines for transgender, non-binary, and genderfluid authors. The Women's Prize later asked for Emezi's "sex as defined by law" when submitting The Death of Vivek Oji for inclusion. Emezi chose to withdraw, and said that they would not submit their future novels for consideration, calling the requirement transphobic. Joanna Prior, Chair of Trustees for the Women's Prize for Fiction, has stated that in the prize's terms and conditions, "the word 'woman' equates to a cis woman, a transgender woman, or anyone who is legally defined as a woman or of the female sex".

See also

 List of literary awards honoring women

References

External links

Shortlisted works for the Orange Prize at LibraryThing
Orange Prize for Fiction's "50 Essential Reads by Contemporary Authors" at LibraryThing

 
Awards established in 1996
1996 establishments in the United Kingdom

Literary awards honoring women